

	

Western River is a locality in the Australian state of South Australia located on the north coast of Kangaroo Island overlooking Investigator Strait about  south-west of the state capital of Adelaide and about  west of the municipal seat of Kingscote.

Its boundaries were created in March 2002 for the “long established name” which was derived from the river located within its boundaries.  In 2011, a portion of the adjoining locality of Middle River was excised and added to Western River.  A school operated within what is now the locality here between 1901 and 1903.

Western River occupies land bounded by Investigator Strait to the north.  Land use is divided between conservation and agriculture with the former applying to the coastline in order to “enhance and conserve the natural features of the coast” and to the protected area known as the Western River Wilderness Protection Area while the latter applies to land in the locality's southern half.

Western River is located within the federal division of Mayo, the state electoral district of Mawson and the local government area of the Kangaroo Island Council.

See also
Western River (disambiguation)

References
Notes

Citations

Towns on Kangaroo Island